In geometry, the Exeter point is a special point associated with a plane triangle. The Exeter point is a triangle center  and is designated as  the center X(22) in Clark Kimberling's Encyclopedia of Triangle Centers. This was discovered in a computers-in-mathematics workshop at Phillips Exeter Academy in 1986. This is one of the recent triangle centers, unlike the classical triangle centers like centroid, incenter, and Steiner point.

Definition

Exeter point is defined as follows. 
Let ABC be any given triangle. Let the medians through the vertices A, B, C meet the circumcircle of triangle ABC at A' , B'  and C'  respectively. Let DEF be the triangle formed by the tangents at A, B, and C to the circumcircle of triangle ABC. (Let  D be the vertex opposite to the side formed by the tangent at the vertex A, E be the vertex opposite to the side formed by the tangent at the vertex B, and F be the vertex opposite to the side formed by the tangent at the vertex C.) The lines through DA' , EB'  and FC'  are concurrent. The point of concurrence is the Exeter point of triangle ABC.

Trilinear coordinates
The trilinear coordinates of the Exeter point are

 ( a ( b4 + c4 − a4 ), b ( c4 + a4 − b4 ), c ( a4 + b4 − c4 ) ).

Properties
The Exeter point of triangle ABC lies on the Euler line (the line passing through the centroid, the orthocenter , the de Longchamps point, the Euler centre  and the circumcenter) of triangle ABC. So there are 6 points collinear over one only line.

References

Triangle centers